EDJ may refer to:

 Bellefontaine Regional Airport, in Ohio, United States
 The Emily Dickinson Journal, an academic journal
 Eric D. Johnson (born 1976), American singer-songwriter, composer and multi-instrumentalist